Bohdan Serhiyovych Bychkov (born 24 November 1994) is a Ukrainian professional footballer who plays as a right-back for Ukrainian club Poltava.

References

External links
 
 
 

1994 births
Living people
Sportspeople from Kropyvnytskyi
Ukrainian footballers
Association football defenders
FC Oleksandriya players
MFC Mykolaiv players
FC Kremin Kremenchuk players
FC Hirnyk-Sport Horishni Plavni players
SC Poltava players
Ukrainian First League players
Ukrainian Second League players